Alloeorhynchus nigrolobus is a species of damsel bugs in the family Nabidae. It is found in North America.

References

 Thomas J. Henry, Richard C. Froeschner. (1988). Catalog of the Heteroptera, True Bugs of Canada and the Continental United States. Brill Academic Publishers.

Further reading

 

Nabidae
Insects described in 1922